Makedonski Brod is a municipality in western North Macedonia, named after the town of Makedonski Brod, where the municipal seat is located. Makedonski Brod Municipality is part of the Southwestern Statistical Region.

Geography
The municipality borders
 Želino Municipality and Brvenica Municipality to the north,
 Studeničani and Sopište municipalities to the northeast,
 Čaška and Dolneni municipalities to the southeast,
 Kruševo Municipality to the south,
 Plasnica Municipality to the southwest,
 Kičevo Municipality to the west, and
 Gostivar Municipality to the northwest.

The municipality includes the Kozjak Hydro Power Plant and the associated artificial lake, the largest such lake in the country.

Demographics
By the August 2004 territorial division of Macedonia, the rural Samokov Municipality was attached to Makedonski Brod Municipality, which then totaled 7,141 inhabitants. Before the merge,
 The municipality of Makedonski Brod had 5,517 inhabitants in 1994 and 5,558 in 2002
 Samokov Municipality had 2,057 inhabitants in 1994 and 1,553 in 2002
 In 2021 the municipality of Makedonski Brod had 5,889 people.

Notable people
 Gjurčin Naumov - Pljakot, revolutionary, born in Slansko
 Tasa Konević, Macedonian Serb Chetnik, born in Krapa
 Micko Krstić, Macedonian Serb Chetnik, born in Latovo
 Zafir Premčević, Macedonian Serb Chetnik, born in Ljupšte
 Trenko Rujanović, Macedonian Serb Chetnik, born in Krapa
 Ilija Slanštanec, writer and historian, born in Slansko 
 Dane Stojanović, Macedonian Serb Chetnik, born in Krapa
 Božidar Vidoeski, linguist, born in Zvečan

References

External links
 Official website

 
Southwestern Statistical Region
Municipalities of North Macedonia